Nurida Zulfi kizi Kurbanova is an Azerbaijani philosopher, known for her research in the sphere of alternative medicine and parapsychology. She was born in Shusha city. When Nurida was ten years old, she was hit by lightning and spent over a month in a coma. Nurida Kurbanova has a Ph.D. in philosophy and a candidate of Energy and Information Sciences. For her scientific work, Kurbanova was awarded several high international awards. She is the founder of the International Fund For Contribution for Peace and Culture.

Awards
Nurida Kurbanova is a holder of the “Golden Eagle” medal awarded by the International Prize Union of the United Nations (UNCOPA) and the “INTERSAFETY" Committee ("International Security") for achievements in strengthening international security, for contributing to the fight against drug addiction, environmental crimes, and global threats. For her services in the protection of a healthy lifestyle, the development of traditional medicine, and support of public safety, Kurbanova was also awarded a gold medal "For Merits to Society" with the title "Ambassador of the Mission of the World". In 2016, during an official ceremony held in Oslo, Norway, she was awarded an honorable Dialogue for Peace Foundation's award. Kurbanova was also nominated for a Russian "Breakthrough of the Year 2016" and became a laureate of this award. Her healing theory and practical methods were studied in the Research Center for Traditional Medicine of the Russian Federation. At present, she lives in Moscow, Russia, and is known as a public figure and researcher in the sphere of parapsychology.

References

http://nuridakurbanova.com 
http://nuridakurbanova.com/ru/info/90/ 

Living people
People from Shusha
Year of birth missing (living people)
21st-century philosophers